Hong Guk-yeong (1748 – 28 April 1781), was a noted Korean scholar and politician of Joseon dynasty who first strongly supported King Jeongjo's accession and toiled to improve the king's power, but ended up being expelled because of his desire for power. He served the king in the closest proximity of all government officials and often enjoyed great power that was derived from the king's favor. Hong Guk-yeong and Han Myeong-hoe (during Sejo's reign) are some examples of chief royal secretaries who were the most powerful officials of their time.

Life
Hong Guk-yeong was born in 1748 in Hanseong into the Pungsan Hong clan. He was the only son of Hong Nak-chun and his wife, Lady Yi of the Ubong Yi clan. Through his father, he was an 11th degree great-nephew of Lady Hyegyeong (mother of King Jeongjo), as well as the 5th great-grandson of Hong Joo-won and Princess Jeongmyeong.

He served as one of the most trusted advisors and close confidantes to Jeongjo when he was the Crown Prince Yi San. He was also the main tutor of the Crown Prince Yi San. After Yi San ascended the throne as Jeongjo, Hong was promoted to Chief Inspector, Chief of the Royal Guard, and Chief Royal Secretary due to his skill at politics and investigation. His younger sister Lady Hong also became one of Jeongjo's concubines and Hong Guk-yeong hoped to enhance his influence by being related to the King's future heir. However, his sister would die out of grief after a failed cover-up of a phantom pregnancy (due to potential scandal). Enraged over the fact that she died unforgiven by Queen Hyoui and her remark that he would have no influence over the next heir, he made a bargain with Queen Jeongsun to allow him to be the adoptive parent of a member of the royal family. In the end, he was exiled for trying to poison Queen Hyoui out of anger over his sister's death and to prevent his bargain from being exposed, for Queen Hyoui discovered it and threatened to tell King Jeongjo. He aborted the attempt after discovering that the King was taking her place at the food ceremony and tearfully confessed. He later died on 28 April 1781 at peace due to health issues after being forgiven by the king.

In popular culture
Portrayed by Lim Dong-jin in the 1978 TBC TV series Sang-no.
Portrayed by Kim Sang-kyung in the 2001 MBC TV series Hong Guk-yeong.
 Portrayed by Han Sang-jin in the 2007 MBC TV series Lee San, Wind of the Palace.
 Portrayed by Choi Jae-hwan in the 2011 SBS TV series Warrior Baek Dong-soo.
 Portrayed by Kang Hoon in the 2021 MBC TV series The Red Sleeve.

References

External links
Hong Guk-yeong on Namuwiki .

Joseon scholar-officials
18th-century Korean people

1748 births

1781 deaths

Joseon politicians